The Rawlings Gold Glove Award, usually referred to as the Gold Glove, is the award given annually to the Major League Baseball players judged to have exhibited superior individual fielding performances at each fielding position in both the National League (NL) and the American League (AL), as voted by the managers and coaches in each league. Managers are not permitted to vote for their own players.  Eighteen Gold Gloves are awarded each year (with the exception of 1957, 1985, 2007 and 2018), one at each of the nine positions in each league. In 1957, the baseball glove manufacturer Rawlings created the Gold Glove Award to commemorate the best fielding performance at each position. The award was created from a glove made from gold lamé-tanned leather and affixed to a walnut base. Initially, only one Gold Glove per position was awarded to the top fielder at each position in the entire league; however, separate awards were given for the National and American Leagues beginning in 1958.

Greg Maddux has won the most Gold Glove Awards among all players, including pitchers, in Major League Baseball history. He won 18 awards, all in the National League; his streak of wins was consecutive from 1990 through 2002 until interrupted by Mike Hampton in 2003. Maddux won five more awards from 2004 to 2008, after which he retired. Jim Kaat is second and held the record for most wins (16) until he was displaced by Maddux in 2007. He won 14 awards in the American League and 2 in the National League; his 16 consecutive awards is a record among winners. Bob Gibson won nine Gold Gloves with the St. Louis Cardinals, and the inaugural winner Bobby Shantz won four awards in each league, for a total of eight. Mark Langston and Mike Mussina are tied for the fifth-highest total, with seven wins each. Zack Greinke currently ranks seventh with six wins. Gold Glove winners at pitcher who have been inducted into the Baseball Hall of Fame include Gibson, Mussina, Maddux, Steve Carlton, Jim Palmer, and Phil Niekro.

Maddux made the most putouts in a season (39) three times in his career (1990, 1991, and 1993). The American League leader is Frank Lary, who made 32 putouts for the Detroit Tigers in 1961. Kaat is the leader in assists; he made 72 with the Minnesota Twins in 1962. The National League leader, Maddux, trails him by one (71 assists in 1996). Many pitchers have posted errorless seasons and 1.000 fielding percentages in their winning seasons; Mussina is the leader with four perfect seasons in the field. Ron Guidry (1982–1984) and Mussina (1996–1998) both accomplished the feat in three consecutive seasons. The most double plays turned by a winning pitcher is nine, accomplished by Maddux in 2006. Four pitchers have also thrown no wild pitches in a winning season: Maddux (1997, 2006), Kaat (1975), Shantz (1961, 1962), and Kenny Rogers (2005). In contrast, the most wild pitches in a winning season is 18, by the knuckleballing Niekro. The fewest balks in a winning season is zero, achieved many times, but Maddux accomplished the feat the most time in his wins (12 balk-free seasons in 18 years). The most balks in a winning season is five, by Mike Norris in 1981, Orel Hershiser in 1988 and Mark Buehrle in 2010. Buehrle picked off the most runners from the pitcher's mound in a winning season, with 11 in 2010; Clayton Kershaw leads the National League with 9 pickoffs in 2011. Rogers posted both the highest (100% in 2002) and lowest (0% in 2005) caught stealing percentage in a winning season; the latter also tied with Dallas Keuchel (2015 and 2018) in the American League. Shantz' 1961 season tied Rogers' 0% mark for lowest percentage caught, and Greinke leads the National League (80% caught).

Key

American League winners

National League winners

Footnotes
In 1957, Gold Gloves were given to the top fielders in Major League Baseball, instead of separate awards for the National and American Leagues; therefore, the winners are the same in each table.
Statistics only count Leake's time in the American League. Leake pitched 22 games with the Mariners before being traded to the National League's Arizona Diamondbacks on July 31, 2019.
Statistics only count Greinke's time in the National League. Greinke pitched 23 games with the Diamondbacks before being traded to the American League's Houston Astros on July 31, 2019.

See also
Gold Glove-winning batterymates

References
General

Inline citations

External links
Rawlings Gold Glove Award official website

Gold Glove Award
+